Dorylaeus or Dorylaüs (early 1st century BC), was a commander in the Kingdom of Pontus who served under Mithridates the Great. Dorylaeus reinforced Archelaus with eighty thousand fresh troops after the latter's loss at Battle of Chaeronea. Dorylaeus wanted to bring about a battle with Sulla right away, but changed his mind after a skirmish with Roman troops.

Bibliography
Plutarch: Sulla, 20
Strabo: Geography, 10.4.10
Inscription: OGIS 372

People of the Kingdom of Pontus
1st-century BC people
Hellenistic generals